This is a list of commercial banks in Guinea-Bissau

Banco Da Africa Ocidental
Banco Da Uniao	
Banque Régionale de Solidarité	
Ecobank

External links
 Website of Central Bank of West African States

See also
Central Bank of West African States (Banque Centrale des États de l'Afrique de l'Ouest)
List of banks in Africa
Economy of Guinea-Bissau
 List of companies based in Guinea-Bissau

References

 
Banks
Guinea-Bissau
Guinea-Bissau